William D. Dean (born September 1, 1940) was an American politician and television and media producer.

Dean was born in Mankato, Minnesota and went to the Minneapolis, Minnesota and St. Louis Park, Minnesota Elementary Schools. He graduated from Monrovia High School in Monrovia, California. Dean served in the United States Army during the Vietnam War. Dean graduated with a bachelor's degree in speech communication from the University of the Pacific in Stockton, California and from University of Minnesota with a master's degree in speech communication. He lived in Minneapolis, Minnesota with his wife and family. Dean served in the Minnesota House of Representatives from 1975 to 1982 and was a Republican.

References

1940 births
Living people
Politicians from Mankato, Minnesota
Politicians from Minneapolis
Television producers from Minnesota
Military personnel from Minnesota
University of the Pacific (United States) alumni
University of Minnesota alumni
Republican Party members of the Minnesota House of Representatives